Michael George Campbell (4 June 1954 – 15 March 2008), better known as Mikey Dread, was a Jamaican singer, producer, and broadcaster.  He was one of the most influential performers and innovators in reggae music.

Biography
Born in Port Antonio, one of five children, from an early age, Campbell showed a natural aptitude for engineering and electronics. As a teenager he performed with the Safari and Sound of Music sound systems, and worked on his high school's radio station. 

He studied electrical engineering at the College of Arts, Science and Technology, and in 1976, started out as an engineer with the Jamaica Broadcasting Corporation (JBC). Campbell wasn't impressed that the JBC's playlists mainly consisted of bland, foreign pop music at a time when some of the most potent reggae was being recorded in Jamaica.  He convinced his JBC bosses to give him his own radio program called Dread at the Controls, where he played almost exclusively reggae.  Before long, Campbell (now using the DJ name Mikey Dread) had the most popular program on the JBC.  Well known for its fun and adventurous sonic style, Dread at the Controls became a hit all over Jamaica. Examples of Mikey Dread's distinctive radio chatter can be heard on the US release of the RAS label LP African Anthem Dubwise. 

He also began working as a recording artist, Lee "Scratch" Perry producing his signature tune "Dread at the Controls", also recording for Sonia Pottinger and Joe Gibbs, and performing with the Socialist Roots sound system. Inevitably, JBC's conservative management and Campbell clashed, and he quit in protest in 1978, becoming an engineer at the Treasure Isle studio, where he began an association with producer Carlton Patterson. They co-produced Dread's own work (e.g. "Barber Saloon") and that of others.

By the late 1970s he had started his own DATC label, working with artists such as Edi Fitzroy, Sugar Minott, and Earl Sixteen, as well as producing his own work. The label released Dread's albums Evolutionary Rockers (released in the UK as Dread at the Controls), and World War III.

Campbell's music attracted the attention of British punk rockers The Clash, who invited him over to England to tour with them in 1980, going on to produce some of their music. Although initially suspicious of the strangers, Campbell soon became friends with the band, producing their "Bankrobber" single and performing on several songs on their 1980 album Sandinista!. Campbell also toured with The Clash across Britain, Europe, and the US, gaining many new fans along the way. He studied at the National Broadcasting School in London in 1980 and in 1984 studied advanced recording technology at the North London Polytechnic.

During the early 1980s he provided vocals with the reggae collective Singers And Players on Adrian Sherwood's On-U Sound record label. Dread produced ten dub tracks for UB40 and toured Europe and Scandinavia as their support artist.

Some of his works in the United Kingdom include hosting series such as Rockers Roadshow and narrating the six-part Channel 4 reggae documentary series Deep Roots Music.  He later recorded "The Source (Of Your Divorce)" for Warner Brothers Records US, which obtained regularly rotated video airplay.

In 1991, Dread recorded Profile and African Anthem Revisited.  He also toured in Europe and the US with Freddie McGregor, Lloyd Parks, We The People Band, and the Roots Radics Band.

In 1992, he collaborated with former Guns N' Roses guitarist Izzy Stradlin on a duet entitled "Can't Hear 'Em".  He was nominated for a NAIRD award, an award from the Billboard Magazine, for his work on his 1990 compilation album Mikey Dread's Best Sellers.

In 1993, Mikey Dread was involved in several projects, including his tour supporting the album Obsession and working in TV with the Caribbean Satellite Network (CSN) where he was Program Director and on Air personality as well as Producer of various shows.

In 1994 he presented The Culture Award of Honor in the Martin's International Reggae Music Awards in Chicago.  In 1995, he worked as a Radio DJ for WAVS 1170 AM and WAXY-AM 790 in Miami, Florida. In 1996 he participated in the Essential Music Festival as a performer in Brighton, UK.

Mikey furthered his knowledge of TV/Video Production at the Art Institute of Ft. Lauderdale, where he graduated in 1996 with Honors and at Lynn University in Boca Raton / Florida where he earned a Bachelor of Arts Degree in International Communications, with Magna Cum Laude honours.

He performed live with The Clash, UB40, Bob Dylan, Carlos Santana, Macka B, and many other bands and artists.  He also produced artists such as Sugar Minott, Junior Murvin, Earl Sixteen, Wally Bucker, Sunshine, Jah Grundy and Rod Taylor. He also worked closely with producer Trevor Elliot to launch musical career of singer Edi Fitzroy.  Mikey Dread was the featured artist on "Lips Like Sugar" with Seal for the soundtrack of the 2004 film, 50 First Dates.

After many years working as a producer and singer, Campbell withdrew from the business and moved to Miami where he furthered his college education with courses in electronics and business, and ran the Caribbean Satellite Network TV station in Miami. Campbell shrewdly waited until all of his existing contracts expired and then regained control over his entire catalogue; He began re-releasing much of it on his own Dread at the Controls record label.

He performed at the Montreux Jazz Festival in 2002 and at Glastonbury Festival in 2004, and toured the UK in 2006.

Dread, together with The Blizzard of 78, featured on The Sandinista! Project, a tribute to the 1980 Clash album Sandinista!, with the song "Silicone on Sapphire".  The tribute album, recorded in 2004, was released on 15 May 2007 by the 00:02:59 Records (a label named after a lyric from the Sandinista! song "Hitsville UK").

In October 2007, it was announced that Campbell was being treated for a brain tumor. He died on 15 March 2008, surrounded by his family, at the home of his sister in Stamford, Connecticut. He left seven children, three daughters and four sons, the youngest of whom was 4 months old when he died and who he had with his wife Monica.

Discography

Studio albums

Compilations

Singles 
 "Love the Dread" (1978), DATC
 "Step By Step" (1978), 40 Leg
 "Barber Saloon" (1978), Warrior
 "Roots Man Revival" (1979), High Note
 "African Rap" (1979), Wild Flower
 "Rasta Born Baby" (1979), Roots International
 "African Map" (1979), DATC
 "Break Down the Walls" (1980) (DREAD 1)
 "Rockers Delight" (1980), DATC
 "Jumping Master" (1980), DATC
 "Reggae Gone International" (1980), DATC
 "Warrior Stylee" (1981), DATC
 "Positive Reality" (1982), DAT
 "Rocky Road" (1982), DATC/Do It
 "Roots & Culture" / "Jungle Dread" (1982), DATC (DATCD 008)
 "Bad Man Posseé" (1982), DATC - with Junior Murvin
 "Pound A Weed" (1982), DATC - with Roots Radics
 "Warning" (1982), DATC
 "Heavy Weight Style" (1982), Do It
 "Sunday School" (1983), DATC
 "Reggae Hit Shot" (1984), DEP International
 "Knock Knock" (1985), DEP International
 "Rude Little Dread" (1986), DATC
 "The Source (Of Your Divorce)" (1989), Warner Bros US
 "Choose Me" (1989), DATC
 "King of Kings" (2001), Higher Ground

Appears on 
 Sandinista! (1980;  album by The Clash)
 The Trojan Story Vol. 2 (1982; compilation album by various artists; TALL 200)
 Singers and Players  – Staggering Heights (1983; On-U Sound), "School Days"
 Singers and Players  – Leaps and Bounds (1984; Cherry Red), "Autobiography (Dread Operator)" and "Vegetable Matter"
 Funky Reggae Crew – Strictly Hip-Hop Reggae Fusion (1989; compilation album by various artists; 926 011-1)
 The Roots of Reggae Vol. 1 (1991; compilation album by various artists; MCCD 014)
 Larks From the Ark (1995; compilation album by Lee "Scratch" Perry; NTMCD 511)
 History of Trojan Records 1972–1995 Volume 2 (1996; compilation album by various artists)
 Arkology (1997; compilation album by Lee "Scratch" Perry; CRNCD 6)
 Rockers Galore (1999; compilation album by The Clash; ESK 47144)
 Classic Reggae: The Producers (2000; compilation album by various artists; MCCD 444)
 Dub Reggae Essentials (2000; compilation album by various artists)
 Blunted in the Bomb Shelter Mix (2002; compilation album by Madlib; ANTCD102)
 Auralux Reggae Showcase (2004; compilation album by various artists; LUXXCD007)
 50 First Dates (2004; compilation album by various artists)
 Radio Clash (2004; compilation album by various artists)
 Best 1991–2004 (2004; compilation album by Seal)
 Echodelic Sounds of Future Pigeon (2006; album by Future Pigeon)
 Singles Box (2006; compilation album by The Clash; Sony BMG)
 Down in a Tenement Yard: Sufferation and Love in the Ghetto 1973–1980 (2007; compilation album by various artists; TJDDD352)
 Family Front (2008; Album by Habakuk; 5935240)
 Royale Rockers: Reggae Sessions (2008; album by Casino Royale)
 Iration – Generation Time (Ft. Mikey Dread)

References

External links

 
 Official Label website
 Official Podcast with Insomnia Radio website
 Mikey Dread Online Memorial

Articles
 Complicated Dread: the Mikey Dread interview Complicated Fun, 21 June 2006
 Mikey Dread  Interview: Mikey Dread at the controls trakMARX.com – Punk Rock... & Roll, trakMARX 21 – October 2005 – The No Time To Be 21 Issue

1954 births
2008 deaths
Deaths from brain cancer in the United States
Jamaican radio presenters
Jamaican reggae musicians
ROIR artists
People from Port Antonio
Trojan Records artists
Lynn University alumni
Heartbeat Records artists